Maite Dono (born 17 February 1969) is a Spanish singer-songwriter, poet, and actress. She is a recipient of the Egoísta International Book Award and the Esquío Poetry Award.

Biography

In 1993, she began her theatrical activity as an actress. In 1998, she began her musical career with her first solo album: Corazón de Brief, in homage to the folk singer-songwriter , in which she sang his works accompanied only by the piano of Manuel Gutiérrez. Dono's second album, titled O mar vertical (2001), was more personal and included her own songs. The work was accompanied by a book of poems of the same name. She also participated in the Cantigas de Nadal compilation CD. She has collaborated on projects with different artists from the Galician scene: jazz, accompanying Baldo Martínez and pianist Alberto Conde, performing medieval cantigas with Carlos Beceiro, and works with Roberto Somoza. She has also participated in musical works by Na Lúa and La Musgaña.

Since 2006, Dono has experimented poetically and musically with Intruso. Her latest contributions to music were in the Miño Project, from bassist Baldo Martínez, and a duet with Martínez on Sons Nús. In 2013, she participated as an actress in the play Hamlet post scriptum, directed by Roberto García de Mesa. She has written stories and theatrical works. She has several unpublished books, among which Poemas da Mamachán ou de cómo podrecen os fardos (in Galician) stands out. Her poems have been part of various anthologies and collective books. She has published in magazines such as Salamandria, El Planeta, Madrygal, and Mester de Vandalía. She resides in Santiago de Compostela.

Works

Music
 1998: Corazón de brief
 2001: O mar vertical
 2010: Sons nús, with Baldo Martínez

Poetry
 1996: Manta de sombra (in Spanish). Libertarias/Prodhufi.
 2000: O mar vertical (in Galician). Espiral Maior. .
 2004: Desilencios v. Sociedade de Cultura Valle-Inclán.
 2009: Circus girl (in Spanish). El Gaviero. 
 2013: Sobras (in Spanish). El Gaviero.

Collective works
 2011: Tamén navegar (in Galician), Toxosoutos.

Awards and recognitions
 1995: 1st Egoísta International Book Award, for Manta de sombra
 2003: 23rd , for Desilencios

References

1969 births
21st-century Spanish actresses
21st-century Spanish women writers
Galician-language writers
Galician poets
Living people
People from Vitoria-Gasteiz
Spanish women singer-songwriters
Spanish singer-songwriters
Spanish stage actresses
Spanish women poets